This is a list of events that happened in 2017 in Mexico. The article also lists the most important political leaders during the year at both federal and state levels.

Incumbents

Federal government
 President: Enrique Peña Nieto, Institutional Revolutionary Party, 

 Interior Secretary (SEGOB): Miguel Ángel Osorio Chong 
 Secretary of Foreign Affairs (SRE):
Claudia Ruiz Massieu, until January 4
Luis Videgaray Caso, starting January 4
 Communications Secretary (SCT): Gerardo Ruiz Esparza
 Education Secretary (SEP): Aurelio Nuño Mayer
 Secretary of Defense (SEDENA): Salvador Cienfuegos Zepeda
 Secretary of Navy (SEMAR): Vidal Francisco Soberón Sanz
 Secretary of Labor and Social Welfare (STPS): Alfonso Navarrete Prida 
 Secretary of Welfare (BIENESTAR): Luis Enrique Miranda Nava
 Tourism Secretary (SECTUR): Enrique de la Madrid Cordero
 Secretary of the Environment (SEMARNAT): Rafael Pacchiano Alamán
 Secretary of Health (SALUD): José Narro Robles
Secretary of Finance and Public Credit, (SHCP)
Luis Videgaray Caso, until November 27
José Antonio González Anaya, starting November 27

Governors

 Aguascalientes: Martín Orozco Sandoval 
 Baja California: Francisco Vega de Lamadrid 
 Baja California Sur: Carlos Mendoza Davis 
 Campeche: Alejandro Moreno Cárdenas 
 Chiapas: Manuel Velasco Coello 
 Chihuahua: Javier Corral Jurado .
 Coahuila
Rubén Moreira Valdez , until November 30
Miguel Ángel Riquelme Solís , starting December 1
 Colima: José Ignacio Peralta 
 Durango: José Rosas Aispuro 
 Guanajuato: Miguel Márquez Márquez 
 Guerrero: Héctor Astudillo Flores 
 Hidalgo: Omar Fayad .
 Jalisco: Aristóteles Sandoval 
 State of Mexico
Eruviel Ávila Villegas , until September 15
Alfredo del Mazo Maza , starting September 16 
 Michoacán: Silvano Aureoles Conejo 
 Morelos: Graco Ramírez .
 Nayarit
Roberto Sandoval Castañeda , until September 18
Antonio Echevarría García , starting September 19
 Nuevo León: Jaime Rodríguez Calderón ("El Bronco") Independent, until December 31.
 Oaxaca: Alejandro Murat Hinojosa .
 Puebla
Rafael Moreno Valle Rosas , until January 31.
José Antonio Gali Fayad , starting February 1.
 Querétaro: Francisco Domínguez Servién 
 Quintana Roo: Carlos Joaquín González .
 San Luis Potosí: Juan Manuel Carreras 
 Sinaloa: Quirino Ordaz Coppel 
 Sonora: Claudia Pavlovich Arellano 
 Tabasco: Arturo Núñez Jiménez 
 Tamaulipas: Francisco Javier García Cabeza de Vaca 	
 Tlaxcala: Marco Antonio Mena Rodríguez 
 Veracruz: Miguel Ángel Yunes Linares 
 Yucatán: Rolando Zapata Bello 
 Zacatecas: Miguel Alonso Reyes 
Head of Government of the Federal District/Mexico City: Miguel Ángel Mancera, Independent

Events

January to March
1 January – Consumers are concerned about abrupt increases in gasoline prices, known as el gasolinazo.
18 January – Colegio Americano del Noreste shooting; a 15-year-old student shoots a teacher and three classmates in Monterrey.
12 March – Former Interim governor Flavino Ríos Alvarado of Veracruz is arrested for covering up his predecessor´s, Javier Duarte de Ochoa, crimes and helping him escape.
13 March – SEP announces educational reform measures.
14 March – A mass grave site of more than 250 people is discovered in Palmas de Abajo, Veracruz.
16 March – Prison escape in Culiacán.

April to June
10 April – Former Tamaulipas governor Tomás Yarrington, (PRI), is arrested in Italy, charged with plotting the murder of gubnatorial candidate Rodolfo Torre Cantú in 2010.
15 April – Former Veracruz governor Javier Duarte, (PRI, 2010-2016) is arrested in Panajachel, Sololá Department, Guatemala.
21 May – A 42-year-old Russian Nazi kills a 19-year-old man in Cancun after a mob tries to lynch the Russian. He had earlier posted anti-Mexican racist comments on YouTube, but authorities refused to deport him.
4 June – Elections
Gubnatorial election in the State of Mexico, won by Alfredo del Mazo Maza (PRI).
General elections in CoahuilaNayarit; Miguel Ángel Riquelme Solís (PRI), elected governor.
General elections in Nayarit; Antonio Echevarría García (PAN), elected governor.
Municipal elections in Tlaxcala and Veracruz.

July to September
August – Hurricanes Franklin and Katia; the latter kills two in Veracruz.
21 August – A partial solar eclipse is visible.
7 September
A magnitude 8.1 earthquake hit off southern Mexico coast, 300 injuries, 98 people killed, and tsunami have surrounding warning issue.
The Chamber of Deputies ends a logjam.
19 September – A magnitude 7.1 earthquake strikes central Mexico, killing more than 200 people.

October to December
 10 November — At 7:25 local time, eruption of Popocateptl continues.
18 to 20 November – Sales for El Buen Fin are less than anticipated.
25 December – An earthquake in Acapulco of 5.0 magnitude triggers the alarm in Mexico City, but no injuries or damages are reported.

Holidays, and observances

January 1 – New Year's Day, statutory holiday
January 6 – Feast of the Epiphany
February 2 – Feast of Candlemas
February 6 – Constitution Day, statutory holiday
February 14 – Day of Love and Friendship
February 20 – Mexican Army Day, civic holiday
February 23 to 28 – Carnival in Mexico
February 24 – Flag Day, civic holiday
March 8 – International Women's Day
March 18 – Anniversary of the Mexican oil expropriation, civic holiday
March 20 – March equinox
March 21 – Benito Juárez's Birthday, statutory holiday
April 9 to 15 – Holy Week
March 13 – Holy Thursday
March 14 – Good Friday
April 21 – Heroic Defense of Veracruz, civic holiday
April 30 – Children's Day
May 1 – Labour Day, statutory holiday
May 5 – Cinco de Mayo, civic holiday
May 8 – Miguel Hidalgo y Costilla's Birthday, civic holiday
May 10 – Mother's Day
May 15 – Teachers' Day
June 1 – Mexican Navy Day, civic holiday
June 18 – Father's Day
June 20 – June solstice
September 13 – Anniversary of the "Heroic Cadets", civic holiday
September 15 – Cry of Dolores, civic holiday
September 16 – Independence Day, statutory holiday
September 30 – José María Morelos's Birthday, civic holiday
October 12 – Day of the Race, civic holiday
November 1 – All Saints' Day
November 2 – Day of the Dead
November 20 – Revolution Day, statutory holiday
November 26 – Feast of Christ the King
December 12 – Feast of Our Lady of Guadalupe
December 16 to 24 – Las Posadas
December 21 – December solstice
December 24 – Christmas Eve
December 25 – Christmas Day, statutory holiday

Awards

Belisario Domínguez Medal of Honor – Julia Carabias Lillo
Order of the Aztec Eagle
David Drier, U.S. Congressman (R-CA).
Stuart Gulliver, HSBC
Marcelo Rebelo de Sousa, President of Portugal
National Prize for Arts and Sciences
Linguistics and literature – Alberto Ruy Sánchez Luy
Physics, Mathematics, and Natural Sciences – María Elena Álvarez-Buylla Roces
Technology and Design – Emilio Sacristan Rock
Popular Arts and Traditions – Francisco Barnett Astorga
Fine arts – Nicolás Echevarría
History, Social Sciences, and Philosophy – Mercedes de la Garza Camino
National Public Administration Prize
Ohtli Award
 Sarahi Espinoza Salamanca
 Joseph I. Castro

Deaths

January

January 1
Edson Tadeo Cárdenas Huerta (17), soccer player (Tigres UANL) (b. 1999).
Martha Patricia Figueroa Juárez (53), social activist, businesswoman, politician in Cordoba, Veracruz; cáncer.
Serafín Espinal (65), músician.
January 2 
Ernesto Franco Cobos, cultural promoter and writer in Tuxpan.
Olegario Contreras Rubio, radio announcer in Sinaloa; heart problems.
Analy Loera, businesswoman and cultural promoter; brain and lung cancer.
January 3
Cecilia González Gómez, 55, politician, Deputy (2012-2915); heart attack (b. 1961).
Lucía Eugenia Torres Pereda, journalist.
January 5
Marco Francisco González Meza, public servant, accidente de tráfico.
Alfonso Humberto Robles Cota, Roman Catholic bishop of Tepic (b. 1931).
Cesáreo Víctor Santiago López, polítician from Oaxaca; murdered.
Carmen Sánchez Galán (45), public servant; complicaciones post-operative complications.
January 15
Isidro Baldenegro López, environmental activist, murdered.
Gorky González Quiñones, ceramist (b. 1939).
January 16 – Romeo Gómez Aguilar (97), músician and academic (b. 1919).
January 17 – Martín Barrón Félix (52), physicist and meteorologist; liver failure and anemia (b. 1964).
January 18 – Raúl Muñoz Popoca (77), businessman in tourist industry.
January 19
David Contreras, polítician (PRI) and public servant; diabetes.
Fernando Soto (17), músician from Jalisco; drowning.
January 20 – Abraham Ibarra Robles, public servant from Santa María Colotepec, Oaxaca; murdered.
January 21 – Fernando Maiz Garza (57), businessman, builder, and philanthropist; airplane crash (b. 1959).
January 22
Jesus Garcia, 72, boxer.
Juan Huerta Ortega (67), businessman and rancher from Puebla; heart attack (b. 1949).
Isidro Patrón Lara, musician.
January 23 – Giovanni Arturo Amparan Zaragoza (30), businessman; shot.
January 24
Ismael Gutiérrez (79), boxer (b. 1937).
Antolín Vital Martínez, polítician, mayor of Tepexco, Puebla; murdered.
January 25
Adalberto Rosas López, polítician from (Ciudad Obregón), Sonora; thrombosis.
Agustín Sauret (85), voice actor ("Ned Flanders" in The Simpsons).
Raúl Valerio, 90, actor (Por tu amor (telenovela), Clase 406, La Verdad Oculta, Imperio de Cristal).
January 26 – Javier García Narro, businessperson and leader of Coparmex (a business association) in Saltillo, Coahuila.
January 27
Fredman Cruz Maldonado, singer; lung problems.
Mario Palestina Moreno (45), baseball player; heart attack (b. 1971).
January 28
Benjamín Cabral, filmmaker.
Víctor Hugo Saldaña Gutiérrez (22), soccer player; murdered (b. November 8, 1994).
January 29
Omar Jair Canepa Polanco, public servant; murdered.
Ángel García Cook (79), anthropologist and researcher (INAH) (b. 1937).
Jorge Robles, músician and singer; cáncer.
January 30 – Fidel Briano (72), lawyer and journalist.
January 31 
Pedro Koh Cimé, Yucatan polítician; murdered.
José Luis Lagunes López, public servant; cáncer.

February
February 3 – Lorenzo Servitje, 98, businessman and philanthropist, co-founder of Grupo Bimbo (b. November 20, 1918. 
February 7 – Eusebio Ruvalcaba (65), writer (Un hilito de sange), journalist, essayist, playwright (b. 1951).
February 9 – Josefina Leiner, actress (b. 1929).
February 15 – José Solé, 87, stage actor and director (Premio Nacional de Ciencias y Artes) (b. July 28, 1929).
February 16 – Teresa del Conde, art historian and critic (b. 1935).
February 21 – Neus Espresate Xirau (83), Spanish-born Mexican editor (founder of Ediciones Era); complicaciones respiratorias (n. 1934).
February 22
David Bárcena Ríos, equestrian and modern pentathlete (b. 1941).
Ricardo Domínguez, 31, welterweight wrestler; colon cancer (b. 1985).
February 27 – Eva Maria Zuk, 71, Polish-born Mexican pianist; lung problems.

March
March 3
Rolando Arellano Sánchez (22), músician and singer ("Grupo Contacto"), murdered.
Miguel Guzmán Rosales (66), painter.
March 5
Abril Campillo (58), actress; breast cancer (b. 1958).
Tony Flores (67), comedian; Amyotrophic Lateral Sclerosis.
Alejandro Rosales (49), television star (El Sibidibidi); heart attack.
José Ignacio Rosillo Rodríguez (85), journalist.
March 6 – Jesús Silva Herzog Flores, 81, economist and politician (PRI) (b. 1935)
March 9
Enrique Ortiz Rivas, mathematician, politician, and labor leader; surgical complications.
Raquel Parot (92), actress
Juan Gabriel Sánchez Gómez (43), leader of taxi drivers in Tizayuca, Hidalgo; murdered.
Zorro (62), singer and politician, stroke.
March 12
Mario Agredano Brambila (88), radio and television announcer, reporter, and commentator in Nuevo Leon.
Joaquín Arizpe de la Maza, businessman and philanthropist.
Refugio Arturo García Moreno (63), education leader ("Conalep"); heart attack.
Raúl Maldonado Mendoza, poet and orator from Oaxaca; heart attack.
March 13 – Sarah Jiménez, engraving artist, member of the Salón de la Plástica Mexicana; respiratory problems (b. 1927).
March 14 – José Iván Ponce, labor leader in Tizayuca, Hidalgo; murdered.
March 15 – Armando Garza Sada (84), engineer, businessman (Cuauhtémoc Moctezuma Brewery), and banker (Banco de Londres y México and Banpais).
March 18
Juan Miguel de Mora Vaquerizo (96), member of the International Brigade during the Spanish Civil War, university professor, and writer (b. October 18, 1921).
Santiago Vela, reporter for "Radio Formula" in Fortín de las Flores, Veracruuz; murdered.
March 19 – José Reza Fernández (61), polítician in Cuatro Ciénegas, Coahuila; suicide.
March 20
Arturo Cruz Bárcenas (58), journalist (La Jornada); renal disease.
Carlos Hermosillo Arteaga, 39, politician (PRI), Deputy (2015-2018) and public servant in Chihuahua; auto accident (b. 1977).
Antonio Riviello Bazán (90), former Secretary of National Defense (1988) (b. Nov 21, 1926). 
Humberto Romo Medina, radio and television announcer in Nuevo Leon.
March 21
Víctor Bartoli (65), writer (Mujer Alabastrina) from Ciudad Juárez, Chihuahua. 
Marco Villafán (64), translator and adaptor of theatrical productions.
March 23 – Miroslava Breach, 54, journalist (La Jornada and El Norte de Chihuahua); murdered (b. August 7, 1962).
March 29
Felipe Altamirano Carrillo, Indigenous priest from Nayarit; murdered.
Dennis Palomo (21), comedian; suicide.
Aurelio Prado Flores (68), Roman Catholic social activist and columnist (La Voz) (B. 1949).
Leodegario Varela González, polítician from Zacatecas; cáncer.
March 30 – Six murders in Oaxaca:
Juan José Hernández Alchino, 38, teacher from Pinotepa Nacional.
Rutilio Quirino Barragán Andrade, 75, former mayor of Santiago Tamazola (PRD).
Amada Berenice H. V., a high school student from Santiago Jocotepec. 
Abel Rivera Roque, 31, called El Tortilla, from Tuxtepec.
March 31 – Rubén Amaro Sr., 81, baseball player (Philadelphia Phillies, New York Yankees) and coach, World Series champion (1980); natural causes (b. 1936).

April
April 2 – Alma Delia Fuentes, actress (Los Olvidados (1950) A toda máquina (1951), and Historia de un corazón (1951)) (b. 1937).
April 7 – Arturo García Bustos, 90, painter (b. 1926).
April 8 – José Ángel Nájera Sánchez Fisherman, professional wrestler (b. 1951)
April 9
Roger Arellano Sotelo, polítician, former mayor of Acapetlahuaya, Guerrero; murdered.
Fidencio Escamilla Cervantes (65), poet and playwright from Tonala, Jalisco; heart attack (n. 1951).
Margarita Isabel, 75, Mexican actress (Cronos), emphysema.
Alicia Rivas Lombera, high school theater teacher; cáncer.
José Alberto Toledo Villalobos, anti-mining activist in San Pedro Tapanatepec, Oaxaca; murdered.
April 11 – Teresa Moran, 78, painter from Puebla (b. September 15, 1939).
April 12
Rafael Junquera Maldonado, writer and activist (Student movement of 1968) from Xalapa, Veracruz (b. 1941 or 1942).
Rubén Morales Rodríguez, 79, public accountant from Veracruz (city).
April 13 – Antonio Xiu Cachón (76), Maya Indigenous leader.
April 14 – Max Rodríguez Palacio, journalist and reporter ("Colectivo Pericú"); murdered.
April 19 – Demetrio Saldivar Gómez, politician (founder of Party of the Democratic Revolution in Guerrero); murdered.
April 21 – Rogerio César Armenta Ramírez, journalist (El 10 de Guerrero).
April 22 – Leobardo Flores Ávila, 102, co-founder of the Confederation of Mexican Workers in Torreón, Coahuila.
April 24
Evangelina Villegas, 92, biochemist.
Juan José Flores Lira, polítician, mayor of Ignacio de la Llave, Veracruz; heart attack.
April 28
Brazo de Oro, wrestler; heart attack (b. 1959).
Alejandro Hernández Santos, polítician, mayor of San Bartolomé Loxicha, Oaxaca; murdered.
April 29 – Filiberto Álvarez Landeros, journalist and radio announcer in Jojutla, Morelos (Poemas y cantares and La Señal); murdered.

May
May 1 – Santos Vega Camargo (73), actor and theater director ("El Confesionario") from Torreón (b. November 1, 1943. 
May 3 – José Herrera Aispuro (51), director of the College of Accounting and Administration of the Autonomous University of Sinaloa; murdered.
May 4 – Guadalupe González Saíno (30), polítician from Jopala, Puebla; murdered.
May 7 – Gran Apache, 58, professional wrestler (AAA), intestinal cancer.
May 11
José Manuel Amarillas Monjardín, polítician from Novolato, Sinaloa; murdered.
 Andrea Romero Rojas, food propomoter (cacao) from Zacatelco, Tlaxcala (b. 1953).
May 12
Miguel Ángel Sánchez Morán, public servant and criminal lawyer from Mazatlán; murdered.
May 13
 Hermenegildo Aké Sarabia, labor leader and politician from Playa del Carmen, Quintana Roo.
 Enrique Barrera Chávez (86), form tresurer of Coahuila.
May 15
Felipe Ehrenberg, 73, artist, professor and publisher (b. June 27, 1943).
Javier Valdez Cárdenas, journalist (Ríodoce, La Jornada), shot and killed by unidentified gunmen (b. April 14, 1967).
 Ángel Noé Mercado Carrillo (43), physician and public servant (director is ISSSTE in Tehuacan, Puebla); murdered (b. 1974).
 Jonathan Rodríguez Córdova (26), journalist and reporter (El Costeño de Autlán) from Autlán, Jalisco; he and his mother were murdered.
May 16 – Mario Moreno Ivanova (57), comedian, son of Cantinflas (b. 1960).
May 17 – Raúl Córdoba, 93, soccer player (Club Atlas, national team) (b. March 13, 1924).
May 18
 Armando Arce Serrano (57), camera operator and video journalist (Televisa) (b. 1959).
 Oscar González Guerrero (91), comic book writer and illustrator.
 José Mercado Luna (89), soccer player (1948 Olympic Team) (b. August 6, 1928).
 Enrique Soto Gonzáles, chronicler, historian, and public servant from Pátzcuaro, Michoacan; heart attack.
May 19 – David Sánchez, 25, flyweight boxer, traffic collision.
May 20 – Miguel Vázquez Torres, Indigenous Huichol leader; murdered.
May 22 – Santiago Salas de León, académic, writer, and rector of open university.
May 24 – Miguel Ángel Camacho Zamudio, physician and public servant (director of ISSSTE in Mazatlan); murdered.
May 25 – Juan Carlos Zamarripa Fernández, polítician, mayor of Pánuco, Veracruz; murdered.
May 27 – Jaasiel Hernán Contreras Vega, photographer; murdered.
May 31 – Fernando Sarabia Beltrán (108), académic and activist.

June
June 2 – Armando Mendoza Duarte (48), polítician; murdered (b. 1969).
June 3
Juan Robinson Bours, businessman from Ciudad Obregón, Sonora; Alzheimer's disease (b. December 25, 1928)
Antonio Sarabia (72), writer (Tres pies al gato) (b. June 10, 1944).
June 5
Eduardo Catarino Dircio, politician (Morena) from Tixtla de Guerrero municipality, Guerrero; killed by state police.
Eleazar Vargas Lara, community leader and politician from Iguala, Guerrero; murdered.
Ana Winocur (44), journalist; pancreatitis (b. October 1972).
June 6 – Jorge Ortiz Murray, leader of fishermen in Mazatlan; heart attack.
June 8 
Antonio Medellín, 75, Mexican actor (Tres veces Ana, Porque el amor manda, Cuando me enamoro).
Elmer Arias Gutiérrez (24), músician; murdered.
Crisóforo Otero Heredia, politician (PRD), former mayor of Tecpán de Galeana, Guerrero (2012-2015); murdered.
June 30 – Ramiro Alejandro Celis, 25, bullfighter, gored.
June 10 – Luis Fuentes Molinar, 89, journalist and politician (PRI), former mayor of Chihuahua (1977-1980) and federal Deputy (1973-1976).
June 11 – Radamés Díaz Meza, Culiacán, Sinaloa, businessman; murdered.
June 15 – Raúl Miranda Valencia, 48, lawyer and public servant from Michoacan; murdered.
June 17 – Luis Rey Sifuentes, politician (Morena) from Chihuahua; shot.
June 21 – Ulises Hueto Elizalde ("El Chispa") (33), boxer from Mexico City; murdered.
June 23 – Eva Castañeda Cortés (87), social activist (Unión de Comuneros Emiliano Zapata) from Morelia, Michoacan.
June 24
Camilo Juan Castagne Velazco, police commissioner of La Antigua, Veracruz; murdered alongside another police officer.
Jorge Humberto Higareda Magaña (75), businessman and leader of truckers in Puebla (b. 1942).
June 26
Salvador Adame, journalist from Gabriel Zamora, Michoacan; murdered (found dead this date).
Alejandro Zepeda Ortiz (27), journalist and reporter from Chiapas; suicide.
June 27
Pablo Martín Obregón, journalist (Televisa) from Chilpancingo, Guerrero; suicide (hanging).
Valentín Pimstein 91, Chilean-born television producer (Televisa) who lived in Mexico (b. August 9, 1925).
June 29
Rodolfo Díaz ("Chivo") (78), boxer and trainer; diabetes.
Vinicio Ferrer Merino, polítician, mayor of San Mateo Sindihui, Oaxaca; killed during agrarian conflict.
Demetrio Jaime Martínez Benítez, politician, former mayor of San Francisco Cahuacúa, Oaxaca; killed during agrarian conflict.
Meztli Sarabia Reyna, activist (Unión Popular de Vendedores Ambulantes (UPVA) “28 de Octubre”) from Puebla; murdered.
June 30 – Ramiro Alejandro Celis, 25, bullfighter, gored.

July
July 1 
Gregorio Delgadillo Santos (38), polítician (Morena) from Ciudad Nezahualcóyotl; murdered.
Simón Flores Ramón, polítician and government worker from Atlacomulco, State of Mexico; electrical discharge.
July 2
Martín Feregrino Quiróz (27), lawyer and educator (Autonomous University of Queretaro); breathing problems.
Rodrigo D Garay, actor.
July 3 – José Luis Cuevas, 83, artist.
July 4 – Walter González Arriaga, polítician; murdered.
July 5 – Luis López Villa (71), Catholic priest from Los Reyes La Paz, State of Mexico; throat slit.
July 6
David Alonso López, 39, boxer, shot.
Mariano Herrán Salvatti (68), lawyer and civil servant; liver condition.
Héctor Villasana Rosales (78), lawyer and académic; anemia. 
July 7
Sergio Fuentes Gutiérrez, lawyer and researcher.
Jorge Juan Rodriguez Reyes, labor leader; automobile accident.
July 8 – Guadalupe Baltazar Rojas, chronicler and craftswoman from Ixtenco, Tlaxcala.
July 9 – Diego Zavala Pérez (85), lawyer, académic, and polítician, father of Margarita Zavala; heart attack.
July 10 – Pedro Joaquín Alberto Cárdenas Segura, músician, composer, and orquestra director.
July 13 – Héctor Lechuga, 88, comedian, actor and radio personality (México 2000), heart attack.
July 14
René Chávez (69), baseball player.
Carlos Torres González, UANL High School principal; murdered.
Elías Sergio Treviño Earnshaw, former mayor of Monclova, Coahuila.
July 17 – Martha Nava (75), Mexico's best female basketball player.
July 18 
Irma Camacho García (67), polítician (substitute mayor of Temixco, Morelos, 2016-2017); cardiorespiratory arrest.
Erika Mireles, voice actress ("The Simpsons" and "Doña Clotilde").
July 19 – Hortensia de la Concepción Orozco Tejada, polítician; stroke.
July 20 – Felipe de Jesús Pérez Luna (48), criminal; shot by police.
July 21 – Ángel Padilla, músician (harp player).
July 22
Juan Bernardo Ruvalcaba, boxer and trainer; killed during robbery.
José Arturo Tolosa Campos (59), Sinaloa photojournalist (El Debate); accidente de tránsito.
July 23 – Erwin Trejo (47), singer (Juan Gabriel's twin); murdered.
 July 24
Juan Figueroa Fuentes, polítician (PRD) and public official; heart attack.
Luis Gimeno, Uruguayan emigrant actor (Mañana es para siempre) (b. 1927).
July 25
Gerardo Gallardo (49), actor ("Chef Ornica") (b. 1967).
David Vera Jiménez (54), public servant in Mexico City; heart attack.
July 26
Saúl Escudero Pozos (48), polítician and public servant; cáncer.
Ramón Xirau, 93, Spanish-born Mexican poet, philosopher and literary critic.
July 28 – Luis Arturo Porras Aceves (78), journalist and reporter (El Heraldo de Chihuahua) (b. 1939).
July 31
Lorenzo Arroyo, immigration activist; amyloidosis.
Baltazar Maldonado Rosales (55), polítician (former mayor of Apizaco Municipality, Tlaxcala; renal insufficiency and cáncer (b. 1961).
Luciano Rivera, journalist and reporter ("Dictamen" and TV channel CNR (176)) in Mexicali; murdered.
José Trinidad Ventura González (42), Presbyterian Church elder in Orizaba.

August
August 2
José Miguel Machorro Alcalá, Catholic priest; stabbed in Mexico City Metropolitan Cathedral.
Edmundo Ortega, músician (bass player) and composer; heart attack.
August 4 – Roberto Corvera Guzmán, rector of Universidad Angelópolis in Angelópolis, Puebla; shot.
August 5 – Marcelino Perelló Valls (73), matemátician, académic, and former student activist (b. 1944).
August 6
Víctor Manuel Cárdenas Morales (65), writer and poet; stroke (b. 1952).
Pedro Manterola Sáinz (52), psychologist, politician, and public official from Veracruz; heart attack (b. 1965).
Virgilio Ruiz García, musician from Oaxaca; murdered.
 August 8
Ramón Ángulo Santos (70), polítician former mayor of Angostura Municipality, Sinaloa; cardiac arrest.
Jaime Avilés Iturbe (63), journalist (Unomásuno) and columnist (La Jornada and Proceso); lung cancer.
Rius, 83, political cartoonist (b. June 20, 1934)
August 11 – Eugenio Polgovsky, 40, filmmaker (winner of 4 Ariel Awards).
August 12 – César Osuna Aguirre, baseball player (Venados de Mazatlán); murdered. 
August 15 – Rafael Ramírez Sánchez, polítician,  former mayor of Sahuayo, Michoacán; kidnapped and murdered.
August 16 – Jesús Aranda, journalist (La Jornada) (b. 1963).
August 20
Jerónimo González Huerta (71), artist (b. 1946).
Valdemar Jiménez Solís (90),  poet, académic, and cultural journalist (b. 1926).
Aurora Meza Calles (54), Kumeyaay social activist and translator; pancreatitis.
Martín Rocha Hernández (56), Durango physician and labor leader; lung cáncer.
August 21
Miguel Mike" Orpinel Mendoza, sportscaster; heart attack.
Salomon Robbins (71), athlete and trainer.
August 22
Luis Muruato Puente (88), baseball player (Algodoneros de Unión Laguna).
Cándido Ríos Vásquez, journalist from Veracruz; murdered.
August 23
Mauricio Delfín Domínguez, polítician from Córdoba, Veracruz; suicide.
Ricardo Murguía (68), singer (Yo soy tu amigo fiel), músician, and voice actor (b. 1949).
August 24
Jorge Estrada Álvarez, architect and director or School of Architecture at Autonomous University of Sinaloa.
Genaro Moreno, children's television broadcaster.
August 26
Edgar Gil Yoguez (55), polítician, former mayor of Venustiano Carranza, Michoacán; heart attack.
Alicia Juárez (67), singer; heart attack (b. 1950).
Bertha Elisa Medina Parra, polítician and public servant, former mayor of Mocorito Municipality, Sinaloa.
August 27
Bernardino Cruz Rivas, polítician; cardiac arrest.
Juan Santos Vásquez, polítician, former mayor of San Esteban Amatlán, Oaxaca; run over by a car.
August 29 – Hugo Castro Rosado, businessperson and politician, former mayor of La Antigua, Veracruz; liver failure.
August 30
Efrain Loza, 78, 1964 Summer Olympics soccer player.
José Manuel García León, Tabasco músician; pulmonary emphysema.
August 31 – Nadia Stankovitch (93), Serbian-born Mexican pianist; heart attack (b. 1924).

September
September 2
Gabriela del Valle, actress (Maten a la hiena).
Alejo García García, académic (Instituto Universitario Londres), public servant, and chef.
Oscar Javier González Torres ("El Espectaculo"), 62, músician, actor y comedian; cáncer of the páncreas.
Marisela Ortega Lozano, journalist ("El Paso Times," "El Diario de El Paso," and Reforma); cáncer.
September 3 – Sugar Ramos, 75, Cuban-Mexican Hall of Fame boxer, WBA/WBC featherweight champion (1963–1964), cancer (b. December 2, 1941).
September 4 – José Trinidad Sepúlveda Ruiz-Velasco, 96, Roman Catholic prelate, Bishop of Tuxtla (1965–1988) and San Juan de los Lagos (1988–1999), respiratory complications (b. March 30, 1921).
September 5 – José Durán González, 67, polítician, former mayor of Pueblo Nuevo, Guanajuato; murdered.
September 6 – Raúl Castañeda (34), boxer; murdered (b. 1982).
September 11
Carlos Galván Tello (63), agronomy engineer and public servant (National Forestry Commission of Mexico in Coahuila; cáncer.
Carlos Muñoz Portal (37), assistant television producer ("Narcos" on Netflix); murdered.
September 12 – Álvaro Matute Aguirre (74), historian (UNAM) (b. April 19, 1943).
September 27 – Hiromi Hayakawa, 34, Japanese-born Mexican actress (El Chema) and singer (La Academia), liver hemorrhage during childbirth.
September 28 – Karla Luna (38), actress (Las Lavanderas) and singer; cancer (b. September 25, 1979).

October
October 2 – Evangelina Elizondo, 88, actress (Premio Arlequín 2014; voice of Cinderella in the Walt Disney film), natural causes (b. 1929).
October 4 – Luis de la Hidalga y Enríquez (93), lawyer, public servant, writer ("El Violador de la Rosa", "La Venganza de Lady Wilshire"), and académic (b. December 12, 1923).
October 5 – Édgar Esqueda, journalist (Vox Populi); murdered.
October 6 – Stalin Sánchez, mayor of Paracho de Verduzco, Michoacan; murdered.
October 10 – Manuel Hernández Pasión, mayor of Huitzilan de Serdán, Puebla; murdered along with his wife and a security guard.
October 15 – Gonzalo Martínez Corbalá, engineer, ambassador, politician (PRI), Senator (1982–1988), governor of San Luis Potosi (1991-1992); (b. March 10, 1928).
October 16 – Cecilia Méndez, 60, radio announcer in Zapopan, Puebla; murdered.
October 19
Gaspar Jesús Azcorra Alejos (75), Yucatan priest, writer, and poet (b. 1942).
Julio Chávez Hernández, polítician (PT) and social activist in Veracruz.
October 20 – Crispín Gutiérrez Moreno, politician (PRI), rancher, and mayor of Ixtlahuacán, Colima; murdered.
October 21 – Rosaura Barahona, 75, journalist (El Norte) and feminist writer, pulmonary disease.

November
November 1 – Ignacio Villanueva (86), priest from the Roman Catholic Diocese of Ciudad Juárez.
November 6 – Miguel Espinosa "Armillita" (59), bullfighter from Aguascalientes City (b. September 19, 1958).
November 11
Maru Dueñas (50), actress, director, and theater producer; auto accident (b. October 3, 1967).
Claudio Reyes Rubio, 53, TV director (Televisa); auto accident; (b. August 5, 1964).
November 13 – Miguel Hernández Urbán, painter and sculptor from Tultepec, State of Mexico
November 19 – Claudio Báez, 69, actor and singer.
November 20 – Silvestre de la Toba Camacho, 47, Ombudsman of the Human Rights Commission in Baja California Sur; murdered alongside his son Fernando de la Toba Lucero.
November 25
Jesús Gómez, 76, equestrian, Olympic bronze medalist (1980).
Rosario Green, 76, economist, diplomat and politician, Minister for Foreign Affairs (1998–2000) and Senator (2006–2012).
Rosendo Huesca Pacheco, 85, Roman Catholic prelate, Archbishop of Puebla de los Ángeles (1977–2009).
November 26
Vicente García Bernal, 88, Roman Catholic prelate, Bishop of Ciudad Obregón (1988–2005).
Óscar Lara Aréchiga, 65, politician.
November 28 – Rafael Llano Cifuentes, 84, Mexican-born Brazilian Roman Catholic prelate, Bishop of Nova Friburgo (2004–2010).
November 29
Evelia Lopez Vassallo (82), social activist (Frente Cívico) from Tonalá, Chiapas; long-time illness.
María Angélica Luna Parra, polítician, public servant ("Instituto Nacional de Desarrollo Social"), and social activist.

December
December 5 – Iliana Godoy Patiño (65), narrator, researcher, and poet ("Contralianza" and "Mastil en Tierra") (b. January 22, 1952).
December 8 – Juan Celada Salmón, 101, engineer (Ternium) and inventor (Proceso HYL) (b. February 14, 1916).
December 11 – Jorge Schiaffino Isunza, 70, politician, member of the Chamber of Deputies (1988–1991) (b. April 10, 1947).
December 14 – Javier Villalobos Jaramillo (76), architect, restaurer and académic (b. April 30, 1941).
December 15 – Rubén Pato Soria, 75, professional wrestler.
December 18
Emilio Alvarado Badillo (56), photographer, civil engineer, public servant and académic (ITESM, State of Mexico) (b. 1951).
Ricardo Miledi (90), neuro-scientist (Academia Mexicana de Ciencias y de la Academia Nacional de Medicina de México) (b. September 15, 1927).
Ricardo Suriano (67), journalist (Charamupa) from Tonalá, Chiapas.
December 19
Gumaro Pérez Aguilando (34), journalist and reporter (La Voz del Sur) in Acayucan, Veracruz; murdered.
Fernando Villares Moreno ("Zorro"), 62, singer ("Fugitivo"); stroke.
December 20 – Jesús Castillo Rangel (121), Revolutionary and farmer, Mexico's oldest man; respiratory insufficiency and pneumonia.(b. October 24, 1896).
December 24
Alejandro León Cázarez, baseball journalist and columnist (La Aficion).
Salvador Magaña Martínez, social leader and activist in La Huerta, Jalisco, polítician (Citizens' Movement); murdered.
Sergio Magaña Martínez, 68, polítician (PRI), Senator (1994–2000), businessman, former mayor of Morelia, Michoacan (1993); heart attack (b. December 2, 1949).
José Miguel Rodríguez Asaf (54), businessman (Grupo de Apoyo al Desarrollo de IZAMAL y sus Comisarias), polítician, former mayor of Izamal Municipality.
Juan Silveti Reynoso (88), bullfighter; lung disease (b. October 5, 1929).
December 25
Rudy Casanova (50), Cuban-born Mexican actor (Amores con trampa and Hasta el fin del mundo); breathing problems (b. November 3, 1967).
Alfredo Guzman Guzman, former mayor of Purísima del Rincón, Guanajuato (1977-1979).
José Luis Sánchez Camacho (85), músician.
December 28
David Antón (93), scenographer and costume designer (b. 1924).
Saúl Galindo Plazola, polítician (PRD), former mayor of Tomatlán (2013-2015), Jalisco; murdered.
Arturo Gómez Pérez, polítician mayor of Petatlán, Guerrero; murdered.
Luis Abraham González Contreras (31), photographer y reporter; murdered.
Gerardo Olavarrieta León, hotel owner ("Suites Kokai", "Plaza Kokai", and "Condominios Kokai") in Cancun, Quintana Roo.
Mario Stern (81), composer and académic (b. 1936).
December 31
Regino Díaz Redondo, journalist (Excélsior).
Juan González Gómez ("Juan Cotz"), 63, painter from San Juan Chamula, Chiapas (b. June 24, 1954).

See also
Timeline of Mexican history

Notes

References

 
2010s in Mexico
Years of the 21st century in Mexico
Mexico